Letters to a German Princess, On Different Subjects in Physics and Philosophy (French: Lettres à une princesse d'Allemagne sur divers sujets de physique et de philosophie) were a series of 234 letters written by the mathematician Leonhard Euler between 1760 and 1762 addressed to Friederike Charlotte of Brandenburg-Schwedt and her younger sister Louise.

Contents
Euler started the first letter with an explanation of the concept of "size". Starting with the definition of a foot, he defined the mile and the diameter of the earth as a unit in terms of foot and then calculated the distance of the planets of the Solar System in terms of the diameter of the earth.

Publication
The first two volumes of the 234 letters originally written in French appeared in print in Saint Petersburg in 1768 and the third in Frankfurt in 1774. The letters were later reprinted in Paris with the first volume in 1787, the second in 1788 and the third in 1789.

The publication of the book was supported by the empress Catherine II with her personally writing to Count Vorontsov in January 1766:

Russian translation of the letters followed in Saint Petersburg by Euler's student Stepan Rumovsky between 1768 and 1774 in 3 volumes.

Translations
The first English translation of the Letters were done by the Scottish minister Henry Hunter in 1795.  Hunter targeted the translation at British women, believing that Euler intended to educate the females through his work.

The translation of Hunter was based on the 1787 Paris Edition, of  Marquis de Condorcet and Sylvestre François Lacroix. The translation differed from the original letters of Euler in its omission of "... the frequent, tiresome, courtly address of YOUR HIGHNESS". 
The Marquis de Condorcet's translation, made during the Age of Enlightenment,  was notable for its omission of Euler’s theological references which Condorcet found as "anathema" to teaching science and rationalism.

Translations followed in other languages including Spanish (1798) which differed from the original book by a footnote describing the newly discovered planet Uranus. Subsequent German edition (1847), and French editions (1812 and 1829) were also noted for their reference to Uranus and four minor planets respectively.

References and notes

Attribution

Further reading

 
 
 

Mathematics books
Collections of letters